This is a list of interstate wars since 1945. Interstate warfare has been defined as military conflict between separate states over a territory. This does not include civil wars and wars of independence, or smaller clashes with limited casualties (less than 100  combat deaths). The largest interstate war in history, World War II, involved most of the world's countries, after which the United Nations (UN) was established in 1945 to foster international co-operation and prevent future conflicts. The post-WWII era has, in general, been characterized by the absence of direct, major wars between great powers, such as the United States and (until 1991) the Soviet Union.

List

See also 
 List of wars: 1945–1989
 List of wars: 1990–2002
 List of wars: 2003–present

References

Interstate
Interstate Wars
Lists of armed conflicts in the 21st century